Papoli-ye Vosta (also Romanized as Pāpolī-ye Vosţá, Pā Polī-ye Vasaţī, and Pāypol-e Vostá; also known as Pāplu, Pāpolī, Papoli Soflá, Pāpolī-ye Mīānī, and Pāpūlī) is a village in Zahray-ye Bala Rural District, in the Central District of Buin Zahra County, Qazvin Province, Iran. At the 2006 census, its population was 134, in 38 families.

References 

Populated places in Buin Zahra County